Bulbophyllum putidum is a species of orchid.

putidum